"Peekaboo" is the sixth episode of the second season of the American television drama series Breaking Bad. It was written by J. Roberts and Vince Gilligan and directed by Peter Medak.

Plot
Jesse Pinkman gets the address of the couple who ripped off Skinny Pete and goes to their dilapidated house. Upon breaking inside, he finds and tends to their young neglected son. When the couple returns home, Jesse holds them up and demands that they return his meth and his money. They give him part of the meth, claiming to have lost the other portion, and show him an ATM they have stolen from a convenience store. The husband, Spooge, works unsuccessfully to open the ATM. While Jesse is busy playing with the son, the wife knocks him unconscious, stealing his gun and drugs. Jesse wakes up to see Spooge trying to open the ATM from the bottom. His wife, angry that he keeps calling her a "skank", knocks the ATM over, crushing him; she then takes his drugs and gets high on the couch. Jesse hurriedly takes back the gun, takes what money he can when the ATM pops open, and calls 9-1-1. He then brings the boy out of the house, tells him not to go back inside, and runs away.

On his first day back teaching after finishing chemotherapy, Walter White teaches his class about Dr. Tracy Hall, the inventor of synthetic diamonds, who earned only a pittance for his invention while General Electric made an incalculable profit. At home, Skyler White gets a call from Gretchen Schwartz, whom she still believes is paying Walt's medical bills. Skyler invites Gretchen over that afternoon, but Gretchen quickly leaves when Walt arrives home. Walt follows Gretchen outside and tells her not to say anything until they can talk. Walt then drives up to Santa Fe to apologize to Gretchen for lying, but Gretchen demands to know why Walt did it and how he has been paying for his treatment. Walt, angry at being cut out of Gray Matter Technologies, denies her any right to that information; Gretchen insists that Walt was the one who left by walking out of their past relationship. Walt curses at Gretchen, making her leave. When Walt gets back home, Skyler tells him that Gretchen called to say that the Schwartzes will no longer be paying for Walt's treatment. Realizing his cover has now been blown, Walt claims that the Schwartzes have gone broke, but promises that he and Skyler will be able to find the necessary money.

Production
The episode was written by J. Roberts and Vince Gilligan and directed by Peter Medak. It aired on AMC in the United States and Canada on April 12, 2009.

Critical reception
The episode was universally acclaimed by critics, with some calling it one of the best in the series. Donna Bowman of The A.V. Club gave the episode an A−, praising the episode for reversing the roles of Jesse and Walter.

In 2009, TV Guide ranked "Peekaboo" on its list of the 100 greatest television episodes of all time.

Aaron Paul was nominated for an Emmy Award for Outstanding Supporting Actor in a Drama Series for this episode.

In 2019 The Ringer ranked "Peekaboo" as the 26th best out of the 62 total Breaking Bad episodes.

In 2022, the twin brothers who shared the role of the young boy who plays peekaboo with Jesse, reunited with Paul and Cranston at an autograph signing.

References

External links
"Peekaboo" at the official Breaking Bad site

2009 American television episodes
Breaking Bad (season 2) episodes
Television episodes written by Vince Gilligan